Glenn Morrison (born September 12, 1985) is a Canadian DJ and record producer from Toronto, Ontario.

Life and career
Morrison is a classically trained pianist. Starting piano lessons at the age of four, he began composing and competing through CMC, Kiwanis Music Festival, Richmond Hill Music Festival, and ORMTA - Ontario Registered Music Teachers Association. Morrison received his ARCT through the Royal Conservatory of Music by the age of 14.

In his early high school years, Morrison discovered Techno from a friend in his science class, and started collecting vinyl and becoming absorbed in underground DJ culture. He then worked at Release Records for five years before starting his own record label Morrison Recordings.  Around the age of 20, Morrison started producing electronic music, learning from close friends deadmau5, Bruce Aisher, Peter Kriek, and Ariaan Olieroock.

As a DJ and performer he entertains with melodic progressive house and big-room club sounds. His first international hit was in 2007 when DJ Tiësto featured his track ‘Contact’ on his compilation In Search of Sunrise 6: Ibiza and it shot to the top of the World Dance Charts.

His hit single ‘Goodbye’ has been Certified Double Platinum and went Number 1 for 11 weeks in a row on the Canadian Artists Billboard Chart, as well as going Number 1 in Russia, Ukraine and the Belarus Billboard Charts. ‘Goodbye’ was the 3rd highest grossing single for radio play in all genres for 2014 in Canada.

For three years Morrison was a resident at Amnesia nightclub in Ibiza, Spain, and was a resident at Space nightclub in Ibiza, Spain for one year after that. He took part in North American residencies as well at Space nightclub in Miami, Florida for two years, along with the Marquee nightclub in Las Vegas, Nevada. Morrison's latest addition to his residency repertoire was a monthly night at Palms Casino's Moon Nightclub in Las Vegas, Nevada.

Morrison has had the support of DJs varying from John Digweed and Richie Hawtin to Pete Tong, David Guetta and Tiesto and has performed around the world with over 400 shows. Morrison has created over 100 tracks which have been put out on over 700 compilations. His productions and remixes have been released on numerous labels including Sony, Universal, EMI, Ministry of Sound, Bedrock, Extinct,  Mau5trap, Songbird, Robbins Entertainment, Pokerflat, Hope and Time.

Alpine Mastering
Morrison is the owner and founder of Alpine Mastering, a mastering studio located in Toronto, Ontario. The studio offers a number of services from Music Production, Mixing and Mastering.

Through Alpine Mastering, Morrison has worked on sound design for video game companies like Nintendo, EA Sports, Activision and Rockstar. A partnership with IMAX for electronic music focused on sound-scoring live theatre visuals. Morrison and IMAX unveiled this concept with a 3 part show series at the 2012 ComicCon .

Morrison Recordings
Morrison also ran Morrison Recordings which designed, developed, manufactured, marketed, sublicensed and supported a wide range of mediums, from music to print services. Over 400 records have been released on Morrison Recordings over the course of five years and 95 releases with artists including deadmau5, 16 Bit Lolitas, Gutterstylz, Robert Babicz, Charley May and Redanka.

In 2016, Morrison Recordings was closed down in order to allow Morrison the time and ability to create and run four new record labels - Dying Light Records, Fall From Grace Records, Ambient Wave Records, and Wolfe Records. Each label caters to different stylistic sensibilities and headspaces.

Awards and nominations

Juno Awards

|-
|  || Glenn Morrison || Breakthrough Artist of the Year || 
|-
|  || "Goodbye" (Glenn Morrison)|| Dance Recording of the Year || 
|-

Sirius XM Radio Music Awards

|-
| 2015 || Glenn Morrison || Dance Artist of the Year || 
|-

SOCAN Radio Music Awards

|-
| 2015 || Glenn Morrison || Artist of the Year || 
|-
| 2015 || "Goodbye" (Glenn Morrison)|| Song of the Year || 
|-
| 2015 || Glenn Morrison|| Dance Artist of the Year || 
|-

Discography

Albums

Into the Deep (2016)

Extended plays
Odyssey (2009)
Drone (2009)

Singles

Other singles
No Sudden Moves/Circles (2007)
Contact/Hydrology (2007)
Cosmic Flight (2008)
A Lament (2008) with Zoo Brazil
Blue Skies with Linda (2008) 
In a Trance (2008)
Rubberband (2008)
Gravity Falling (2008)
Odyssey (2009)
Starship Road (2009)
Playing with Ivory (2010)
Another Suggestion (2010)
Tokyo Cries (2011) (feat. Christian Burns)
Secrets (2011) (feat. Mike Tompkins)
Marquee (2013)
Time Warp (2013)
The Flute (2015) (feat. Brian Cid)
Stereo Retrograde (2016)
Psychedelic (2016)
Diamondback (2016)
Perception (2016)
Expressions (2016)
I'm the King (2016) 
Cold Day (2017) (feat. Whitney Phillips)
Time To Go (2017) (feat. Michael Warren)
All For You (2017) (feat. Rumors)
Little Piece of Summertime (2017) (feat. Deb's Daughter)

Remixes
Bernard Sumner (New Order) - Miracle Cure (2008)
The B-52's - Juliet of the Spirits (2008)
Queen - Bohemian Rhapsody (2009)
Armin Van Buuren - Not Giving Up On Love (2010)
Moby - Life Me Up (2014)
Trevor Guthrie - Summertime (2015)

References

External links 
http://www.beatport.com/artist/glenn-morrison/19729
http://www.soundcloud.com/glennmorrison

1985 births
Living people
21st-century Canadian male musicians
Canadian DJs
Canadian house musicians
Canadian electronic musicians
Canadian record producers
Canadian techno musicians
Canadian sound designers
Mau5trap artists
Musicians from Toronto